"In My Eyes" is the title track and second single from freestyle singer Stevie B's second album In My Eyes. The song became a hit single, entering the Top 40 on the Billboard Hot 100 at # 37.

Track listing
US 12" single

Germany Maxi Single 2001

Charts

Annual Positions

References

1989 singles
Stevie B songs
1988 songs